Saint-Dier-d'Auvergne is a small village-town in the Puy-de-Dôme department in Auvergne-Rhône-Alpes region in central France. The commune of Saint-Dier-d'Auvergne is part of the canton of Billom and of the arrondissement of Clermont-Ferrand.

Geography 
The altitude of the commune of Saint-Dier-d'Auvergne ranges between 416 and 700 meters. The area of the commune is 20.15 km2. The nearest larger towns are Courpière (10 km to the northeast) and Billom (12 km to the northwest).

Population and housing 
In 2019, Saint-Dier-d'Auvergne had a population of 542. As of 2019, there are 416 dwellings in the commune, of which 265 primary residences.

Notable people
 Clotilde Dissard (1873-1919), journalist, feminist

See also
Communes of the Puy-de-Dôme department

References

Saintdierdauvergne